

France
 French Somaliland – René Tirant, Governor of French Somaliland (1962–1966)

Portugal
 Angola – Silvino Silvério Marquês, High Commissioner of Angola (1962–1966)

United Kingdom
 Aden – Sir Charles Johnston, Governor of Aden (1960–1963)
 Aden joins Federation of South Arabia, 18 January
 Malta Colony – Sir Maurice Henry Dorman, Governor of Malta (1962–1964)
 Northern Rhodesia – Sir Evelyn Dennison Hone, Governor of Northern Rhodesia (1959–1964)
 Federation of South Arabia 
 Governor –
 Sir Charles Johnston, High Commissioner of South Arabia (1963)
 Sir Gerald Trevaskis, High Commissioner of South Arabia (1963–1964)
 Minister – 
 Hassan Ali Bayumi, Chief Minister of South Arabia (1963)
 Zayn Abdu Baharun, Chief Minister of South Arabia (1963–1965)

Colonial governors
Colonial governors
1963